is a railway station located in the city of  Ōdate, Akita Prefecture, Japan, operated by the East Japan Railway Company (JR East).

Lines

Station layout
The station consists of one island platform and one side platform serving three tracks, connected to the station building by a footbridge. However, Platform 3 is not in use. Hayaguchi Station is a simple consignment station, administered by Ōdate Station, and operated by Ōdate city authority, with point-of-sales terminal installed. Ordinary tickets, express tickets, and reserved-seat tickets for all JR lines are on sale (no connecting tickets).

Platforms

History
Hayaguchi Station was opened on October 7, 1900 a station on the Japanese Government Railways, serving the village of Hayaguchi, Akita. The JGR became the Japan National Railways (JNR) after World War II. The station was absorbed into the JR East network upon the privatization of the JNR on April 1, 1987.

Passenger statistics
In fiscal 2018, the station was used by an average of 101 passengers daily (boarding passengers only).

Surrounding area
 
 Hayaguchi Post Office

See also
 List of Railway Stations in Japan

References

External links
 JR East Station information 

Railway stations in Japan opened in 1900
Railway stations in Akita Prefecture
Ōu Main Line
Ōdate